The Quebec Group is a geologic group in Quebec. It preserves fossils dating back to the Silurian period.

See also

 List of fossiliferous stratigraphic units in Quebec

References

 
 III.—On Palæosaccus Dawsoni, Hinde, a New Genus and Species of Hexactinellid Sponge from the Quebec Group (Ordovician) at Little Métis, Quebec, Canada. GJ Hinde - Geological Magazine (Decade III), 1893 - Cambridge Univ Press
 Graptolites of the Quebec group. J Hall - 1865

Silurian Quebec